Danj (also known as Qūchkānlū) is a village in Azari Rural District, in the Central District of Esfarayen County, North Khorasan Province, Iran. At the 2006 census, its population was 60, in 14 families.

References 

Populated places in Esfarayen County